is a passenger railway station in located in the city of Higashiōsaka,  Osaka Prefecture, Japan, operated by the private railway operator Kintetsu Railway.

Lines
Kawachi-Kosaka Station is served by the Nara Line, and is located 1.6 rail kilometers from the starting point of the line at Fuse Station and 7.7 kilometers from Ōsaka Namba Station.

Station layout
The station consists of two opposed elevated side platforms, with the station building underneath.

Platforms

Adjacent stations

History
It was renamed  in August 1928 and its present name on March 15, 1941. In 1941 it was transferred to the Kansai Kyūkō Railway, which became part of Kintetsu in 1944.

Passenger statistics
In fiscal 2018, the station was used by an average of 26,959 passengers daily.

Surrounding area
Kinki University (Headquarters Campus)
 Shiba Ryotaro Memorial Hall
Osaka Shoin Women's University
Osaka University of Commerce

See also
List of railway stations in Japan

References

External links

 Nukata Station 

Railway stations in Osaka Prefecture
Railway stations in Japan opened in 1914
Higashiōsaka